Aextoxicon punctatum, the sole species of genus Aextoxicon and family Aextoxicaceae, is a dioecious tree native to southern Chile and Argentina. Commonly known as the olivillo or aceitunillo, it is a large evergreen tree native to the forests of the Valdivian temperate rain forests and Magellanic subpolar forests of southern Chile's Pacific coast, where it forms is a canopy tree in the broadleaf forests. It can reach 15 m tall.

The APG system (1998) and the APG II system (2003) left the family Aextoxicaceae unplaced in the core eudicots. It has since been included in the order Berberidopsidales. The genus was formerly often included in the family Euphorbiaceae.

Description
Aextoxicon punctatum is a large tree often found in the canopy or emergent. It has opposite leaves with dark green coloration on the top and lighter green below, and is covered in rusty peltate scales. The flowers are actinomorphic and unisexual, in hanging racemes. The flowers have 5 sepals and 5 petals. Male flowers have 5 stamens opposite the sepals while female flowers have two carpels that fuse to form a bilocular ovary. The fruit is a single seeded drupe that resembles an olive, thus giving the plant its common name.

Distribution and habitat

Aextoxicon punctatum is found in Chile, usually in damp places from the Bosque de Fray Jorge National Park southwards to the Chiloé Archipelago, also in the Valdivian forest and Magellanic forests of the southern Pacific coast. In Argentina it is present in the middle reaches of the Rio Negro valley, being invasive on the island of Choele Choel, and it is common in the Lago Puelo National Park, Chubut.

Uses
The tree is used for its high-quality timber.

References

External links

 Aextoxicon punctatum in Encyclopedia of the Chilean Flora
 Aextoxicon punctatum in Chilebosque
 Aextoxicon punctatum in Chileflora
 Aextoxicaceae in L. Watson and M.J. Dallwitz (1992 onwards). The families of flowering plants
 Hansen & Rahn: Aextoxicaceae
 NCBI Taxonomy Browser: Aextoxicaceae
 CSDL: Aextoxicaceae 

Berberidopsidales
Flora of the Andes
Flora of central Chile
Trees of Chile
Trees of Argentina
Trees of mild maritime climate
Trees of subpolar oceanic climate
Flora of the Valdivian temperate rainforest
Monotypic eudicot genera
Data deficient plants
Dioecious plants
Taxa named by José Antonio Pavón Jiménez